Askar Baitassov (born September 25, 1984) is a Kazakhstani entrepreneur and restaurateur. Baitassov owns the largest Kazakh restaurant company, AB Restaurants, which comprises more than 20 establishments. The group specializes in international cuisine.

In 2013, Ernst & Young named Baitassov the Entrepreneur of the Year for Kazakhstan.

In 2016 has undertaken the General Management Program at Harvard Business School.

Biography 

Born in 1984 in the village Mezhdurechenskoye in Almaty region, Kazakhstan. Parents – Aiman Mukhametzhanovna Baitassova and Bulat Bakhtygereevich Baitassov. In 2002, graduated from the Kazakh-Turkish Lyceum and entered the State University of Management in Moscow, the Russian-Dutch Faculty of Marketing. As part of this program, he studied in Moscow for three years and two years at the Saxion University of Applied Sciences in Enschede, the Netherlands.

Business

abr www.abr.kz was founded in 2011 and today incorporates 1,500 employees and 50 restaurants within 15 concepts, which include:

Del Papa Italian Osteria chain https://instagram.com/del_papa

Daredzhani Georgian cuisine chain https://instagram.com/daredzhani 

Broadway Burger gastronomic fast-food chain https://instagram.com/broadway.burger 

Luckee Yu Asian Bistro chain https://instagram.com/luckeeyu 

Ramen77 ramen shop chain https://instagram.com/ramen_77 

Coco Street Food restaurant chain https://instagram.com/coco.streetfood.kitchen 

Bochonok beer restaurant chain https://instagram.com/bochonok.kz 

Cafeteria chain of city cafes https://instagram.com/cafeteria_almaty 

Raw Izakaya Bar https://instagram.com/raw.almaty 

Afisha Restaurant https://instagram.com/afisha.restaurant 

Ogonek Restaurant https://instagram.com/ogonek.almaty 

Aroma Parisian bistro https://instagram.com/aroma_kz 

Speakeasy bar Americano https://instagram.com/bar.americano.almaty 

Compote Culinary Studio https://www.instagram.com/compotestudio

References

Restaurateurs
Living people
1984 births